The Bucyrus Bucks were a short-lived minor league baseball team that played in the Ohio–Pennsylvania League in 1905. The club is the only known professional team to ever be based in Bucyrus, Ohio.

References

Defunct minor league baseball teams
Baseball teams established in 1905
Defunct baseball teams in Ohio
1905 establishments in Ohio
Baseball teams disestablished in 1905
Ohio-Pennsylvania League teams